Meutia Farida Hatta Swasono (born 1 March 1947) is an Indonesian anthropologist and politician who served as Indonesia's Minister of Women's Empowerment in Susilo Bambang Yudhoyono's United Indonesia Cabinet. She is the daughter of Indonesia's first vice president, Muhammad Hatta.

Education

Occupation

Editorial Experience

Associations

Politics

See also
List of female cabinet ministers of Indonesia

References

1947 births
Living people
Indonesian Muslims
20th-century Indonesian women politicians
20th-century Indonesian politicians
Government ministers of Indonesia
Women government ministers of Indonesia
People from Yogyakarta
21st-century Indonesian women politicians
21st-century Indonesian politicians